"The General" is a song by the roots rock band Dispatch.

Story
This song tells a story about a brilliant and battle-torn old general, who has a dream in which he realizes the futility of the war he is fighting. He then attempts to persuade his men that they do not have to participate in the battle, but that he would fulfill the job he had sworn to do. He wants them to leave and live a full life.

In The Best of Dispatch, a book containing guitar and voice transcriptions of selected Dispatch songs, Chad Urmston describes "The General":

Formats
The song has appeared in multiple formats, including its original version on the album Bang Bang, as well as multiple live versions on their albums Gut the Van, All Points Bulletin and, most recently, Dispatch: Zimbabwe. In the Madison Square Garden format, the song features several instruments including the trumpet, saxophone, and trombone, an addition never before featured in the song.

At New York City's Radio City Music Hall in 2012, during the band's Circles Around the Sun tour, the song was performed with a verse from Nena's 99 Red Balloons in the inserted bridge. This, presumably, to add new character to the band's anti-war message.

A Russian language version was released in April 2022 in response to the war in Ukraine, with proceeds from streaming to go toward the Leleka Foundation.

See also
List of anti-war songs

References

Songs about the military
Songs about military officers
1998 songs
Anti-war songs
Dispatch (band) songs